McLean's Scene is a studio album by saxophonist Jackie McLean. It was recorded in 1956 and 1957, but not released until 1959 on Prestige's subsidiary label New Jazz Records, as NJ 8212. It was reissued on CD in 1991. Three tracks features McLean in a quintet with trumpeter Bill Hardman, pianist William “Red” Garland, bassist Paul Chambers and drummer Art Taylor, and the remainder a quartet with pianist Mal Waldron, bassist Art Phipps and Art Taylor.

Track listing 
"Gone with the Wind" (Allie Wrubel, Herb Magidson) - 7:31
"Our Love Is Here to Stay" (George Gershwin, Ira Gershwin) - 4:21
"Mean to Me" (Fred E. Ahlert, Roy Turk) - 8:50
"McLean's Scene" (McLean) - 10:21
"Old Folks" (Dedette Lee Hill, Willard Robison) - 4:56
"Outburst" (McLean) - 4:34

Recorded on December 14, 1956 (#1, 3, 4) and February 15, 1957(#2, 5, 6).

Personnel
Tracks 1, 3, 4
Jackie McLean - alto sax
Bill Hardman - trumpet
Red Garland - piano
Paul Chambers - bass
Art Taylor - drums

Tracks 2, 5, 6
Jackie McLean - alto sax
Mal Waldron - piano
Arthur Phipps - bass
Art Taylor - drums

References 

1959 albums
Jackie McLean albums
Albums produced by Bob Weinstock
New Jazz Records albums